Luis Fernando Da Silva Jr. (born August 3, 1982), also known as Trikz, is an American actor, basketball player, author, and producer. He gained fame after headlining the 2001 Nike Freestyle ad campaign.

Basketball career
In a 2001 episode of This American Life, Da Silva was the first streetball athlete to be signed to an advertising contract by Nike. He performed with Alicia Keys in 2001 in New York City's Niketown while promoting the well known Nike campaign. He was subsequently mentioned in Scoop Jackson’s main division, titled Sole Provider, which recognized the best of Nike’s 35-year chronicle. In 2003, Da Silva was the youngest player signed to the Harlem Wizards Show basketball team.

Midway Games offered Da Silva a lead in the newly developed video game, L.A. Rush, which sold 1 million units internationally. He has also worked with Midway performing the video game motion capturing for NBA Ballers, NBA Ballers: Phenom, NBA Ballers: Chosen One, NBA 2K8, NBA 2K9 and AND 1 Streetball video games. He has been featured in magazines SLAM and DIME and on the front page of The Wall Street Journal and the cover of TIME overseas.

In 2006, Stephon Marbury and Steve & Barry's announced that Da Silva would hit the road on the Starbury SLAM Tour, with the first of many appearances at Steve & Barry's stores and schools across 120 cities in 60 days to perform his unique style of hip hop themed basketball wizardry in front of kids and parents. Andy Todd, president of Steve & Barry's, said "Trikz is not only a phenomenal performer; he's also a phenomenal guy who kids will enjoy seeing and hearing."

In August 2007, Da Silva fulfilled a childhood dream when he was invited to participate in a Harlem Globetrotters mini-camp in Houston, TX and two days into the camp was offered a contract to join the legendary team.

In October 2008, the Maryland Nighthawks announced that they selected Da Silva with the 14th overall pick as part of their official "Travel team" of the PBL this year, and are set to tour China and other Asian countries during the season.

In 2009, Da Silva achieved a personal goal of setting a Guinness World Record of 24 consecutive neck catches of a basketball. In 2009, Da Silva became the youngest person ever inducted into the City of Elizabeth Athletic Hall of Fame.

Da Silva performed during the 2010 World Basketball Festival in New York City, while the Jay-Z performance took place in the Radio City Music Hall, all presented by Nike.

Acting career
Da Silva began appearing in such films as The Brave One and Pride & Glory in the late 2000s.

He has produced and directed an instructional DVD entitled Freestyle 101, which has been created into an Apple application available on iTunes and Apple store. This DVD is a streetball tutorial that is devoted to inspiring children, adolescents and adults to use basketball in a creative and challenging way of physical fitness.

In 2011, Da Silva played in Fast Five and in the 2012 comedy 21 Jump Street, gaining increasing exposure. With the release of 2013's Dead Man Down, he had his biggest role yet, as Terrence Howard's righthand man, Terry. This was followed up by a role in the 2013 summer hit The Heat featuring Sandra Bullock and Melissa McCarthy.

In 2014, he completed filming roles for several films, like Convergence, Aztec Warrior, American Heist, American Project, American Hero, Triple 9, and Mr. Right.

Da Silva has roles in many of John Travolta's pictures, Gotti, Trading Paint and Speed Kills.

He appears on television in roles on series like Graceland, Person of Interest and Power.

Filmography

Writing career
Silva published his first children's book titled A Boy Named Boo, which he wrote and illustrated.

References

External links
 
 
 Freestyle 101 DVD website. Retrieved on 2011-05-04.

Living people
1982 births
Male actors from New Jersey
Sportspeople from Elizabeth, New Jersey
Basketball players from New Jersey
Street basketball players
American male film actors
American men's basketball players
Guards (basketball)
Point guards
American male television actors
21st-century American male actors
American people of Portuguese descent